The Rampant Age is a 1930 American melodrama film, directed by Phil Rosen. It stars James Murray, Merna Kennedy, and Eddie Borden, and was released on January 15, 1930.

Cast list
James Murray as Sandy Benton
Merna Kennedy as Doris Lawrence
Eddie Borden as Eddie Mason
Margaret Quimby as Estelle
Florence Turner as Mrs. Lawrence
Patrick Cunning as De Witt
Gertrude Messinger as Julie
John Elliott as Mr. Benton
John T. Prince as Party Guest

References

External links 
 
 
 

Melodrama films
Films directed by Phil Rosen
American drama films
1930 drama films
1930 films
American black-and-white films
1930s English-language films
1930s American films